Bayartsetseg Altangerel (born November 29, 1990) is a Mongolian actress, model and beauty pageant titleholder who represented Mongolia at the Miss International 2014, Miss Earth 2015 and Miss World 2016 pageants.

References

1990 births
Living people
Miss World 2016 delegates
Miss Earth 2015 contestants
Mongolian actresses
Mongolian female models
Mongolian beauty pageant winners
People from Ulaanbaatar
21st-century Mongolian women
21st-century Mongolian actors

B...